Year 1206 (MCCVI) was a common year starting on Sunday (link will display the full calendar) of the Julian calendar.

Events 
 By place 

 Byzantine Empire 
 January 31 – Battle of Rusion: The Bulgarian forces (some 7,000 men), under Tsar Kaloyan, defeat the remnants of the Latin army, near the fortress of Rusion in Thrace. Around 120 knights, supported by soldiers and cavalry, are killed in battle or captured. 
 February – The Bulgarians attack and loot the fortified town of Rodosto (see Battle of Rodosto), defended by a Venetian garrison. Later, Kaloyan captures many more towns and fortresses.
 August 20 – Henry of Flanders is crowned as the second emperor of the Latin Empire, in the Hagia Sophia at Constantinople, after hearing of the death of his brother, Emperor Baldwin I, who has died in prison at Baldwin's Tower in Tsarevets Castle, in Veliko Tarnovo (after being captured by the Bulgarians in 1205). Upon Henry's ascension as Latin emperor, the Lombard nobles of the Kingdom of Thessalonica refuse to give him allegiance.

 Asia 
 Temüjin assembles at a Kurultai, a council of Mongol chiefs,  the tribes under his rule and is elected as their leader. He is given the title of "Genghis Khan" of the Mongol people – founding the Mongol Empire. Genghis takes immediate steps to underpin his military command, starting with a fundamental reordering of tribal loyalties. United under one nomadic nation, under one banner and one authority.
 Muqali (or Mukhali), a Mongol general in service of Genghis Khan, is rewarded with the command of the left-wing of the newly reorganized Mongol army and takes control over the eastern Mingghans.
 March 15 – Sultan Muhammad of Ghor is murdered and succeeded by Qutb al-Din Aibak, his deputy in India, who founds the Mamluk Dynasty, the first dynasty of the Delhi Sultanate.

 Europe 
 King Valdemar II (the Conqueror) and Archbishop Andreas Sunonis raid Saaremaa Island (modern Estonia), forcing the islanders to submit. The Danes build a fortress, but finding no volunteers to man it, they burn it down themselves and leave the island.
 The Livonian Brothers of the Sword, in alliance with the Semigallians, conquer the Livonians (or Livs).

 England 
 June – King John (Lackland) lands an expeditionary army at La Rochelle to defend his interests in Aquitaine, which is his from the inheritance from his mother, Queen Eleanor of Aquitaine. Meanwhile, French forces led by King Philip II (Augustus) move south to meet John. The year's campaign ends in a stalemate and a two-year truce is made between the two rulers.

 By topic 

 Art and Culture 
 Sugar, an import from the Muslim world, is mentioned for the first time in a royal English account. Almonds, cinnamon, ginger, and nutmeg are also imported for royal banquets.

 Religion 
 A peasant named Thurkhill in England claims that Saint Julian took him on a tour of Purgatory. Thurkhill includes realistic touches of descriptions of Purgatory's torture chambers. This is also believed by Roger of Wendover, one of his society's leading historians.
 December – The monks of Canterbury want their own sub-prior Reginald for the post of archbishop, while John (Lackland) chooses John de Gray. Pope Innocent III appoints Stephen Langton. Finally, the monks accept the Pope's decision and vote for Langton.

 Technic 
 The Arab engineer Ismail al-Jazari describes many mechanical inventions in his book (title translated to English) The Book of Knowledge of Ingenious Mechanical Devices.

Births 
 c.March 19 – Güyük Khan (or Kuyuk), Mongol emperor (d. 1248)
 April 7 – Otto II, German nobleman (d. 1253)
unknown dates
 An-Nasir Dawud, ruler of Damascus (d. 1261)
 Béla IV, king of Hungary and Croatia (d. 1270)
 Hong Bok-won, Korean general and official (d. 1258)
 Sheikh Edebali, Ottoman religious leader (d. 1326)
 Yaghmurasen ibn Zyan, Zayyanid ruler (d. 1283)
 probable 
 Margaret de Quincy, English noblewoman (d. 1266)
 Maria Laskarina, queen consort of Hungary (d. 1270)

Deaths 
 February 4 – Theobald Walter, Norman High Sheriff (b. 1165)
 March 5 – Thietmar of Minden (or Dietmar), German bishop 
 April 5 – Ottaviano di Paoli, Italian cardinal-bishop and diplomat
 April 7 – Frederick I, German nobleman (House of Lorraine) 
 April 16 – Kujō Yoshitsune, Japanese nobleman (b. 1169)
 April 23 – Suero Rodríguez, Spanish knight and Grand Master
 June 4 – Adela of Champagne, queen of France (b. 1140)
unknown dates
 Artaldus (or Arthaud), French priest and bishop (b. 1101)
 Harald Maddadsson, Norwegian nobleman (b. 1134)
 Huan Zong, Chinese emperor of Western Xia (b. 1177)
 Ismail al-Jazari, Artuqid polymath and inventor (b. 1136)
 Muhammad of Ghor, ruler of the Ghurid Empire (b. 1149)
 William de Burgh, English nobleman (House of Burke)
 Yang Wanli, Chinese politician and poet (b. 1127)

References